Lamioideae is a subfamily of plants in the family Lamiaceae.

Genera include:

 Acanthoprasium
 Achyrospermum
 Acrotome
 Ajugoides
 Anisomeles
 Ballota
 Betonica
 Brazoria
 Chaiturus
 Chamaesphacos
 Chelonopsis
 Colebrookea
 Colquhounia
 Comanthosphace
 Craniotome
 Eremostachys
 Eriophyton
 Eurysolen
 Galeopsis
 Gomphostemma
 Haplostachys
 Holocheila
 Hypogomphia
 Isoleucas
 Lagochilus
 Lagopsis
 Lamiophlomis
 Lamium
 Leonotis
 Leonurus
 Leucas
 Leucosceptrum
 Loxocalyx
 Macbridea
 Marrubium
 Matsumurella
 Melittis
 Metastachydium
 Microtoena
 Moluccella
 Notochaete
 Otostegia
 Panzerina
 Paralamium
 Paraphlomis
 Phlomidoschema
 Phlomis
 Phlomoides
 Phyllostegia
 Physostegia
 Pogostemon
 Prasium
 Pseuderemostachys
 Pseudodictamnus
 Pseudomarrubium
 Rostrinucula
 Roylea
 Rydingia
 Sideritis
 Stachyopsis
 Stachys
 Stenogyne
 Suzukia
 Synandra
 Thuspeinanta
 Warnockia

References

Lamiaceae
Asterid subfamilies